The Russian Question (Russian: Русский вопрос, Russkiy vopros) is a Soviet political drama by renowned filmmaker Mikhail Romm. The film is an adaptation of a play of the same name by Soviet poet and journalist Konstantin Simonov.

Subject 
New York, 1946: a leading US newspaper company sends Harry Smith, a talented correspondent, to the Soviet Union. His task is to write a scaremongering report about the Soviet belligerent and expansionist intentions in order to further a widespread campaign of propaganda undertaken by the American media and the conservative elite. Harry, a former war correspondent, accepts the attractive deal and sets off to Soviet Russia only to fall in love with a country quite different from the picture shown by the "free press" in its Cold War adversary. Back in the United States, Harry finds himself torn by a dilemma between his consciousness as an honest journalist, and the menacing pressure of his superiors, forcing him to write a convenient untruth.

Keeping its ideological design in mind, The Russian Question remains a sophisticated and objective, if somewhat critical portrayal of American Cold War political society. Unlike many other Soviet propaganda films, Romm's drama takes on an American perspective, only showing the Soviet Union discussed in the movie for a short combination of shots. The bulk of the film is centered on American culture, society, politics, history, economy and way of life.

Cast 
 Vsevolod Aksyonov — Harry Smith
 Yelena Kuzmina — Jessie West
 Mikhail Astangov — McPherson
 Mikhail Nazvanov — Jack Gould
Boris Tenin — Bob Murphy
 Mariya Barabanova — Meg
Arkady Tsinman — Bill Preston
 Boris Poslavsky — Hardy
Gennady Yudin — Parker
Sergei Antimonov — Kessler
 Mikhail Troyanovsky — Fred Williams
 Viktor Dragunsky — Radio announcer
Georgy Georgiu — Hairdresser (uncredited)
Valentin Zubkov — Chauffeur (uncredited)
Vladimir Kirillin — Journalist (uncredited)

Awards 
 1948 — Stalin Prize, 1st class (director Mikhail Romm, cinematographer Boris Volchek, actors Vsevolod Aksyonov, Mikhail Astangov, Yelena Kuzmina, Mikhail Nazvanov and Boris Tenin)
1991 — Berlin International Film Festival

References

External links

 The Russian Question on mosfilm.ru

1947 films
1947 drama films
Cold War films
Films about journalism
Films about media manipulation
Films directed by Mikhail Romm
Films scored by Aram Khachaturian
Films set in 1946
Films set in New York City
Films set in the United States
Mosfilm films
1940s Russian-language films
Soviet black-and-white films
Soviet drama films